Rebecca von Lahnstein is a character on the German soap opera Verbotene Liebe (Forbidden Love). The character was portrayed by Jasmin Lord and debuted on June 17, 2008. In 2009, Lord earned the Miss Soap award as the most beautiful actress in a soap opera, followed by the German Soap Award as Sexiest Woman in 2011. It was announced on January 18, 2011 that Lord is going to leave the show and finishes shooting in April 2011. She made her last on-screen appearance on July 27, 2011. After a few months the character was recast with Tatjana Kästel, who made her first on-screen appearance on February 13, 2012.

Creation

Introduction
The character is hardly mentioned before she appears on-screen. It was only declared that Sebastian, then played by Joscha Kiefer, had siblings. Rebecca's first appearance featured a run-in with Gregor Mann, played by Andreas Jancke, who eventually became her first on-screen lover. Rebecca appeared to be a stereotypically rich and spoiled person, even though it's mentioned that Rebecca didn't grow up with much money, since her father ceased contact with his aristocratic family. She had a good relationship with Adrian Degenhardt, played by Klaus Zmorek, who was like a father to she and her siblings after her own father died.

Personality
Initially, Rebecca appeared to be a stereotype of a rich girl who enjoyed superficial pleasures. She loved to go shopping, especially out of frustration so she wouldn't have to come to terms with her personal problems. It was hinted that she did not grow up as lavishly as she later comes to be, so at first Rebecca treated the staff around her like less worthy citizens. Her spoiled way brings her character to be disliked by the audience.  As time goes by and her character is developed, the audience also saw how Rebecca could be easily hurt, especially by those whom she loves. Trying to bring the best out in herself, Rebecca is normally shown as a good friend to people she liked and also seems to have little faith in herself when it comes to her proficiency.

As time goes by, Rebecca becomes a strong woman who starts to know what she wants. With the return of her supposedly dead father Ludwig, she broke free of her past insecurities and flaws. Rebecca even began a romantic triste with waitress Miriam Pesch before the character was suddenly written out because of Jasmin Lord's departure. Verbotene Liebe altered the storyline so that Rebecca would move to New York.

In 2012 Rebecca's character returned from New York City and was portrayed by Tatjana Kästel. With Rebecca's return, the character is developed into a mature, polite, and wiser woman who is dedicated to pursuing a career as a fashion designer, though this can lead her to become a too engrossed in her work at times.

Storylines

2008 - 2011
Rebecca is introduced by running into Gregor Mann, who she eventually takes a romantic interest in. But she originally came to town to visit her brother Sebastian. When Rebecca finds out that her foster father Adrian needs a kidney to save his life, she gets into a huge argument with his son Constantin, who despises his father. Constantin won't help Adrian because he believed him to be the kidnapper of his sister Carla's daughter Sophia. Rebecca and Sebastian can eventually convince Constantin to save Adrian, even though he doesn't change his mind about him. Rebecca starts sleeping with Gregor and develops feelings for him. Gregor tells Rebecca that he just wants to have fun and doesn't search for a serious relationship with her. Rebecca agrees and they continue to stay lovers. When Gregor eventually finds out that Rebecca has fallen in love with him, he breaks it off. She tries to convince him that a relationship between them could work, but Gregor falls in love with Luise von Waldensteyck instead. Rebecca tries to come between them for a while, even working together with Luise's sneaky fiancé Eduard von Tepp. Eventually Rebecca realizes how much Gregor and Luise love each other and tries to overcome her feelings for Gregor.

Rebecca succeeds when she takes an interest in Gregor's younger brother Christian. She tries to get closer to him when Christian starts having problems in his relationship with Oliver Sabel. Being friends with Christian and Olli, Rebecca doesn't want to come between them and tries to stay away. After a while things seem to have come back to normal and Rebecca finally finds someone who has taken an interest in her - David Brandner. He tries everything to finally give Rebecca a feeling of love and appreciation. But Rebecca realizes that she still has feelings for Christian. David is heartbroken and shortly leaves town after he and Rebecca broke up.

Once again, Rebecca is questioning if she ever will find her "Mister Right." As she starts to flirt with a guy, Rebecca realizes that she isn't really interested in him and has problems to get him to leave her alone. "No Limits" waitress Miriam Pesch helps out and kisses Rebecca. After that Rebecca starts to question her sexuality as she enjoyed the kiss with Miriam. The girls have a conversation and eventually kiss again. Rebecca fears what her family might think about it but starts to go overboard when she announces her relationship to Miriam. Agreeing that things moved too fast between them, Rebecca and Miriam broke up after a few weeks.

After that Rebecca tries to concentrate on her career and gets involved with Tanja von Lahnstein, who's involved with her brother Sebastian. She starts working for Ligne Clarisse, a fashion company headed by Tanja. Rebecca gets to be creative in her designing clothes, but soon finds herself at odds with Tanja after confronting her over a controversial publicity campaign. Tanja feels threaten by Rebecca and falsely accuses her of stealing designs and passing them off as hers. As the family doesn't believe Rebecca and even Sebastian sides with Tanja, she is forced to take a job offer in New York City. Before leaving, however, Rebecca gets her revenge by playing the ambition of all members of the Lahnstein Enterprises board of Directors against themselves - with the exception of Helena and Hagen, promising them to sell them her voting rights in the company in exchange of valuable things, like an apartment in New York and a VIP card to get access to high-profile fashion events; turning the job in New York into a great opportunity. Rebecca leaves at odds with her family.

2012 - 2014 (The Marbecca Years)  
In February 2012, Clarissa von Anstetten, who now owns fifty percent of Ligne Clarisse Lahnstein, brings Rebecca back to town to impress Ludwig on his birthday and stabilize her place in the Lahnstein empire. Rebecca forgives her father and shows her family that she has grown up a lot while being in New York and now knows what she wants. As Clarissa promised her a position at Ligne CL, Rebecca demands that she gets her own fashion line or she would return to New York after all. Tanja isn't happy about Rebecca's return at all. After Tanja blackmails Clarissa of her shares of the company, Rebecca makes it known that she won't answer to Tanja. As Elisabeth is named co-CEO of Ligne CL, Rebecca goes strictly to her.

During mid-2012, VL developed a storyline that Rebecca would begin to develop feelings for her close friend Marlene von Lahnstein (née Wolf), who, at the time, was dating her brother Tristan. The story began when Rebecca was under pressure to design a swimsuit collection called "Wet Fantasy" for Tanja von Lahnstein.  Rebecca produced several sketches of the prototype for the collection whilst also helping her friend Marlene come to terms with body dysmorphia after being raped a few months prior.  Overwhelmed with deadlines and her earnest desire to help her friend, Rebecca is forced to redraw her designs from scratch after Tanja dismisses the collection. Marlene, who is best friends with Tanja, appeals to her to give Rebecca more time.  In their conversation, Marlene reveals that Rebecca has helped her appreciate her body once more.  Tanja, who was unaware of Rebecca's good deeds, agrees to give Rebecca more time.  Marlene then goes over to Rebecca's flat with ice cream and an old American movie to help her get over "writer's block."  When Rebecca finally draws inspiration from the film and redraws her collection, Marlene falls asleep on her sofa.  Upon finishing her drafts, Rebecca walks over to Marlene to put a blanket over her, and is overcome with new feelings.

It isn't until Dana Wolf's bachelorette spa night that the other character's are aware that Rebecca may have a crush on someone.  Marlene, also in attendance at the spa party, becomes latched onto the idea of discovering who Rebecca's crush is since she won't publicly reveal it.  At the time, Marlene didn't know Rebecca was also attracted to women.  She only realizes it after she tries to set Rebecca up on a date with the man whom she suspects Rebecca likes (from a hint that Rebecca's muse has "blond hair and blue eyes").  Once she's aware that Rebecca is queer, she is frightened that she herself may be the blond-haired blue-eyed person to whom Rebecca is attracted.  Rebecca coolly denies this after Marlene asks her, and she quickly covers it up by being seen publicly with another woman with similar features.  The story then later picks up between the two when Marlena and Tristan von Lahnstein throw an after-party to their new health club's opening.  A group of friends goes over to Rebecca's to celebrate, and they play a game of spin the bottle.  One friend dares Marlene and Rebecca to kiss after seeing them dance together at the club premiere. After the two kiss, the camera pans to Marlene who looks at once startled and unreadable.

The two had their relationship broken as a result of Marlene being unable to accept herself as a lesbian even after Marlene & Rebecca make love in a night of pure, unadulterated passion.

Marlene accepts Tristan's marriage proposal, leaving Rebecca heartbroken, Rebecca is chosen to design Marlene's wedding dress and weaves the ideal design after seeing Marlene in said dress in a dream. Rebecca admits to Marlene that she loves her and that will always be the case, before completing the wedding dress. Marlene is so moved by the fact that Rebecca completed the perfect dress that she goes over to thank her on  the day before the wedding and the two share a passionate kiss!

On the wedding day, Rebecca is prepared to leave for Los Angeles as her love is still unrequited; however Marlene jilts Tristan at the altar and runs off to find Rebecca. Marlene finds Rebecca in the castle and after taking refuge from the Wolf's in Rebecca's room, finally admits to Rebecca that her love is reciprocated.

See also
The Lahnstein Family

References

Verbotene Liebe characters
Fictional lesbians
Television characters introduced in 2008
Fictional counts and countesses
Fictional fashion designers
Fictional LGBT characters in television